Gisela (fl. 911) was a French princess who was married to Rollo, Duke of Normandy.

Biography
According to limited early records, Rollo was betrothed to Gisela, daughter to the king of West Francia, Charles the Simple, after Rollo's conversion to Christianity upon his ascension as ruler of Normandy in 911. The marriage and the existence of Gisela are not independently confirmed, allowing for a legendary character of Gisela. There is some debate whether, if she did exist, she was a legitimate or an illegitimate daughter of Charles.

Norman chronicler William of Jumieges refers to Rollo having two relationships: a captive taken at Bayeux Poppa to whom he  joined himself to her by marriage more danico ("according to Norse custom"). She was mother of his son William Longsword. He relates that he put Poppa aside to marry Gisela more Cristiano ("according to Christian custom") at the time of the Treaty of Saint-Clair-sur-Epte, and that when Gisela died, he returned to Poppa. However, the absence of any record of this royal princess or her marriage in Frankish sources suggests the entire supposed marriage to Gisela may be apocryphal. If Gisela existed and bore Rollo children within a legal Christian marriage, it is unlikely that Poppa's son William would have been seen as legitimate by Christian Franks.  

A character named Gisla (presented as a daughter of Charles the Bald rather than his grandson Charles the Simple, and as the mother of Rollo's children) is portrayed in the TV series Vikings by Morgane Polanski.

Notes

References

Sources

10th-century French people
10th-century French women
10th-century Normans
10th-century Norman women
Carolingian dynasty
Duchesses of Normandy
People whose existence is disputed
Rollo
Year of birth unknown
Year of death unknown
Legendary French people
Daughters of kings